First Lady of Syria is a title attributed to the spouse of the incumbent president of Syria (currently Bashar al-Assad). For the past 51 years, two consecutive first ladies have come from the same ruling family, the Al-Assad family.

List of first ladies of Syria

References 

 
Syria